The 2002 FIFA World Cup qualification UEFA Group 9 was a UEFA qualifying group for the 2002 FIFA World Cup. The group comprised Albania, England, Finland, Germany and Greece.

The group was won by England, who qualified for the 2002 FIFA World Cup. The runners-up, Germany — who would later reach the final of the tournament proper — entered the UEFA Qualification Playoffs.

England started the qualification process badly, a home defeat to Germany and an away draw with Finland (soon after a poor team performance at the 2000 European Championships) saw the resignation of their manager Kevin Keegan, and the appointment of Sven-Goran Eriksson - the first non-Englishman to be given the job - in his place.  With the new manager, they picked themselves up and won five in a row, while the Germans themselves unexpectedly faltered: also drawing with Finland away from home, they also lost their home match with England by a resounding 5–1.  Finland, in fact, might have been in with a chance of qualification themselves, but they lost a match to the unfancied Greece - whom England had to play in their final match, while Finland played Germany at the same time, with England and Germany guaranteed the top two places and separated only by goal difference. Greece unexpectedly took the lead twice at Old Trafford, and England were only rescued by an injury-time free-kick goal from Beckham to tie the score at 2-2:  in the Germany-Finland match, the news of England's result came through at full-time, but they could only draw 0-0 themselves, England taking the top place on goal difference.

Standings

Results

Goalscorers

6 goals

 Michael Owen

4 goals

 Mikael Forssell

3 goals

 David Beckham
 Aki Riihilahti
 Michael Ballack

2 goals

 Paul Scholes
 Jari Litmanen
 Sebastian Deisler
 Carsten Jancker
 Miroslav Klose
 Marko Rehmer
 Angelos Charisteas

1 goal

 Alban Bushi
 Ervin Fakaj
 Bledar Kola
 Edvin Murati
 Altin Rraklli
 Andy Cole
 Robbie Fowler
 Steven Gerrard
 Emile Heskey
 Teddy Sheringham
 Joonas Kolkka
 Shefki Kuqi
 Teemu Tainio
 Marco Bode
 Dietmar Hamann
 Mehmet Scholl
 Georgios Georgiadis
 Georgios Karagounis
 Nikos Liberopoulos
 Nikos Machlas
 Themistoklis Nikolaidis

References

External links
FIFA official page
RSSSF - 2002 World Cup Qualification
Allworldcup

9
2000–01 in English football
Qual
2000–01 in German football
Qual
2000–01 in Greek football
2001–02 in Greek football
2000–01 in Albanian football
2001–02 in Albanian football
2000 in Finnish football
2001 in Finnish football